The 2017 Stockholm Open (also known as the Intrum Stockholm Open for sponsorship purposes) was a professional men's tennis tournament played on indoor hard courts. It was the 49th edition of the tournament, and part of the ATP World Tour 250 series of the 2017 ATP World Tour. It took place at the Kungliga tennishallen in Stockholm, Sweden from 16 October until 22 October 2017. Fourth-seeded Juan Martín del Potro  won the singles title.

Singles main-draw entrants

Seeds

 1 Rankings are as of October 16, 2017

Other entrants
The following players received wildcards into the singles main draw:
  Elias Ymer
  Mikael Ymer
  Mischa Zverev

The following players received entry from the qualifying draw:
  Simone Bolelli 
  Márton Fucsovics
  Jerzy Janowicz 
  Lukáš Lacko

The following player received entry as a lucky loser:
  Jürgen Zopp

Withdrawals
Before the tournament
  Nicolás Almagro →replaced by  Jürgen Zopp
  John Millman →replaced by  Marius Copil

Doubles main-draw entrants

Seeds

 Rankings are as of October 9, 2017

Other entrants
The following pairs received wildcards into the doubles main draw:
  Jérémy Chardy /  Robert Lindstedt 
  Elias Ymer /  Mikael Ymer

Finals

Singles

  Juan Martín del Potro defeated  Grigor Dimitrov 6–4, 6–2.

Doubles

  Oliver Marach /  Mate Pavić defeated  Aisam-ul-Haq Qureshi /  Jean-Julien Rojer, 3−6, 7−6(8−6), [10−4]

References

External links
 Official website 

 
Stockholm Open
Stockholm Open
2017 in Swedish tennis
Stockholm Open
2010s in Stockholm